The fixture list for the 2023 RFL Championship was issued on 13 November 2022. The regular season comprises 27 rounds to be followed by the play-offs.

All times are UK local time (UTC±00:00 until 26 March 2023, UTC+01:00 thereafter).

Regular season

Round 1

Round 2

Round 3

Round 4

Round 5

Round 6

Round 7

Round 8

Round 9

Round 10

Round 11

Round 12
Round 12 is the Summer Bash where all the fixtures are played at one ground over the weekend. The venue for 2023 is the York Community Stadium.

Round 13

Round 14

Round 15

Round 16

Round 17

Round 18

Round 19

Round 20

Round 21

Round 22

Round 23

Round 24

Round 25

Round 26

Round 27

Notes

References

2023 in English rugby league
2023 in French rugby league